Moniliophthora is a genus of fungi in the family Marasmiaceae. The genus was described in 1978 with M.  roreri as the type species. This fungus, formerly known as Monilia roreri, causes frosty pod rot, a serious disease of Theobroma cacao.

Species
MycoBank lists the following:
 M. aurantiaca
 M. canescens
 M. conchata
 M. marginata
 M. nigrilineata
 M. perniciosa
 M. roreri

See also
List of Marasmiaceae genera

References

External links

Marasmiaceae
Agaricales genera